Martinsville is a city in Clark County, Illinois, United States. The population was 1,118 at the 2020 census.

Geography

Demographics

As of the 2020 census there were 1,118 people, 526 households, and 376 families residing in the city. The racial makeup of the city was 95.17% White, 0.09% African American, 0.09% Asian, 0.98% from other races, and 3.67% from two or more races. Hispanic or Latino of any race were 2.33% of the population.

There were 526 households, out of which 57.41% had children under the age of 18 living with them, 43.16% were married couples living together, 14.64% had a female householder with no husband present, and 28.52% were non-families. 26.05% of all households were made up of individuals, and 14.83% had someone living alone who was 65 years of age or older. The average household size was 2.63 and the average family size was 2.39.

The city's age distribution consisted of 26.2% under the age of 18, 7.4% from 18 to 24, 27.8% from 25 to 44, 21.5% from 45 to 64, and 17.1% who were 65 years of age or older. The median age was 39.8 years. For every 100 females, there were 91.0 males. For every 100 females age 18 and over, there were 84.7 males.

The median income for a household in the city was $46,875, and the median income for a family was $56,354. Males had a median income of $33,594 versus $17,277 for females. The per capita income for the city was $20,993. About 22.6% of families and 27.5% of the population were below the poverty line, including 35.6% of those under age 18 and 7.9% of those age 65 or over.

References

External links
 Martinsville History at Genealogy Trails.

Cities in Illinois
Cities in Clark County, Illinois